Vidya  Sagar Keshri is a politician, social worker and an educationist coming from town  Forbesganj of Araria, Bihar. He was active as a student leader during his initial years in college politics. Later on, he got more and more involved in social work especially working in area of social upliftment of lower castes. He has been striving to create social harmony among different castes and for this purpose he runs an NGO named Sauharda Bharat, which is actively involved in organising intercaste festivals, mela and Pujas.

Vidya Sagar Keshri is a member of the Bharatiya Janata Party from Bihar. He has won the Bihar Legislative Assembly election in 2015 and 2020 from Forbesganj.

References

Living people
People from Araria district
Bharatiya Janata Party politicians from Bihar
Bihar MLAs 2015–2020
Bihar MLAs 2020–2025
1962 births